Nigeria competed at the 2016 Summer Olympics in Rio de Janeiro, from August 5 to 21, 2016. Since the nation made its debut in 1952, Nigerian athletes had appeared in every edition of the Summer Olympic Games, with the exception of the 1976 Summer Olympics in Montreal because of the African boycott.

Nigeria Olympic Committee fielded a squad of 77 athletes, 51 men and 26 women, to compete in ten sports at the Games. It was the nation's largest delegation sent to the Olympics since 2000, increasing by a third of its full roster size at London 2012. Among the sports represented by the nation's athletes, Nigeria marked its Olympic debut in rowing, as well as its return to swimming and men's football after an eight-year hiatus. Apart from the men's football squad, Nigeria also returned to the Olympic scene in men's basketball for the second consecutive time.

Topping the list of most experienced athletes on the Nigerian roster were table tennis players Segun Toriola, who set a record as Africa's first ever athlete to feature in seven Olympics, and Olufunke Oshonaike, who became the first female from her country to compete at her sixth consecutive Games. Other notable Nigerian competitors also included sprinter and 2008 bronze medalist Blessing Okagbare, British-born slalom kayaker Jonathan Akinyemi, basketball players Chamberlain Oguchi and Alade Aminu, and weightlifting veteran Mariam Usman (women's +75 kg). Football midfielder John Obi Mikel was named the captain of the Nigerian squad, while Oshonaike acted as both his assistant and the nation's flag bearer at the opening ceremony.

Nigeria left Rio de Janeiro with only a bronze medal won by the men's football squad (captained by Mikel), scoring a 3–2 triumph over the Hondurans.

Medalists

|  style="text-align:left; width:78%; vertical-align:top;"|

|  style="text-align:left; width:22%; vertical-align:top;"|

Athletics (track and field)

Nigerian athletes have so far achieved qualifying standards in the following athletics events (up to a maximum of 3 athletes in each event):

Following the end of the qualifying period on July 11, 2016, the Athletics Federation of Nigeria (AFN) had selected a list of 27 athletes for the Games, featuring long jumper, sprinter, and Beijing 2008 bronze medalist Blessing Okagbare.

Track & road events
Men

Women

Field events
Men

Women

Combined events – Women's heptathlon

Basketball

Men's tournament

Nigeria men's basketball team qualified for the Olympics by winning the AfroBasket 2015 in Tunisia.

Team roster

Group play

Boxing

Nigeria has entered one boxer to compete in each of the following weight classes into the Olympic boxing tournament. Efe Ajagba had claimed his Olympic spot with a semifinal victory at the 2016 African Qualification Tournament in Yaoundé, Cameroon.

Canoeing

Slalom
Nigeria has qualified one canoeist in the men's K-1 class by obtaining a top finish at the 2015 African Canoe Slalom Championships in Sagana, Kenya.

Football

Men's tournament

Nigeria men's football team qualified for the Olympics by attaining a top two finish at the 2015 U-23 Africa Cup of Nations in Senegal.

Team roster

Group play

Quarterfinal

Semifinal

Bronze medal match

Rowing

Nigeria has qualified one boat in the women's single sculls for the Games at the 2015 African Continental Qualification Regatta in Tunis, Tunisia.

Qualification Legend: FA=Final A (medal); FB=Final B (non-medal); FC=Final C (non-medal); FD=Final D (non-medal); FE=Final E (non-medal); FF=Final F (non-medal); SA/B=Semifinals A/B; SC/D=Semifinals C/D; SE/F=Semifinals E/F; QF=Quarterfinals; R=Repechage

Swimming

Nigeria has received a Universality invitation from FINA to send two swimmers (one male and one female) to the Olympics, signifying its return to the sport after an eight-year hiatus.

Table tennis

Nigeria has entered four athletes into the table tennis competition at the Games. Olympic veterans Quadri Aruna and Olufunke Oshonaike secured places each in the men's and women's singles by virtue of a top four finish at the 2015 All-Africa Games. Meanwhile, Segun Toriola and Offiong Edem took the remaining spots on the Nigerian team by virtue of their top 2 finish respectively at the African Qualification Tournament in Khartoum, Sudan. For Toriola, he has become the fourth table tennis player and the first ever African athlete to appear in seven editions of the Summer Olympic Games.

Abiodun Bode was awarded the third spot to build the men's team for the Games as the top African nation in the ITTF Olympic Rankings.

Weightlifting

Nigeria has qualified one female weightlifter for the Rio Olympics by virtue of a top four national finish at the 2016 African Championships. The team must allocate this place by June 20, 2016.

Wrestling

Nigeria has qualified a total of seven wrestlers for each of the following classes into the Olympic competition. One of them finished among the top six to book Olympic spot in the women's freestyle 53 kg at the 2015 World Championships, while the majority of Olympic berths were awarded to Nigerian wrestlers, who progressed to the top two finals at the 2016 African & Oceania Qualification Tournament.

Men's freestyle

Women's freestyle

See also
Nigeria at the 2016 Summer Paralympics

References

External links 

 

Nations at the 2016 Summer Olympics
2016
Olympics